Ramiz Kovaçi (22 March 1929 – 1994) was an Albanian baritone. One of the most notable opera singers in his generation, he was the main baritone of the National Theatre of Opera and Ballet of Albania and a founder of the Academy of Arts of Albania. In his last years he performed at the İzmir venue of the Turkish State Opera and Ballet. He was a recipient of the People's Artist of Albania and Honor of Nation Order titles.

Life
Kovaçi was born on 22 March 1929 in Krujë, Albania. He graduated from the Jordan Misja Artistic Lyceum under Mihal Ciko, and later pursued his canto studies at the Bulgarian State Conservatoire in Sofia under Professors Hristo Brambarov and Yossifov. He specialized at the Accademia Nazionale di Santa Cecilia in Rome.

Kovaçi became lead baritone of the National Theatre of Opera and Ballet of Albania in Italian operas by Verdi, Rossini, Leoncavallo, and Puccini, as well as Albanian operas by Zadeja, Harapi, and Kono. He is one of the founders of the Academy of Arts of Albania.  After 1991, Kovaçi worked at the İzmir venue of the Turkish State Opera and Ballet.

Kovaçi was consistently in the jury of the Festivali i Këngës, a light music music event, beginning from its second edition in 1963. He had disagreements with composer Çesk Zadeja on which song should be the winner in the 1963 festival (Flake e Borë or the eventual winner Djaloshi dhe Shiu). The dispute was settled with a decision that took into account the intervention of composer Simon Gjoni, another member of the jury, who thought that Djaloshi dhe Shiu was more of a hit than Flake e Borë.

Personal life
In 1963 he married Nikoleta Lilova, a Bulgarian native, and brought her with him to Albania. They had a daughter, who married Edmond Tullumani, father of soprano Ramona Tullumani. Kovaçi died in 1994.

Recognition
Aside from being the recipient of the titles of People's Artist of Albania, and Honor of Nation Order, a prize dedicated to Kovaçi's name is provided to the best baritone of the pan-national festival of lyric voices, which began to be held in Albania in 2015.

References

External links
Link to free recordings of Ramiz Kovaçi

1929 births
1994 deaths
People from Krujë
20th-century Albanian male opera singers
Accademia Nazionale di Santa Cecilia alumni
People's Artists of Albania